The Metropolitan Atlanta Rapid Transit Authority was created as the first public mass transit agency in metropolitan Atlanta. Its formation in 1965 was a result of the campaigning efforts of governmental planning agencies and Atlanta businessmen. The system broke ground on its rail system in 1975.

Early history

The first mention of rapid transit for Atlanta occurred in a series of regional planning reports prepared by the Metropolitan Planning Commission (MPC) in 1950 and 1954. The 1950 report, named Up Ahead, and the 1954 report, named Now for Tomorrow, both primarily dealt with freeway planning, but both specifically mentioned the long-range need for rapid transit in Atlanta.

The MPC began to study rapid transit further, and in two subsequent reports (Access to central Atlanta and Crosstown and bypass expressways) the MPC concluded that increased highway construction would not be adequate to meet future transportation needs. These recommendations were not welcomed by the Georgia Highway Department, who believed that highways were an adequate solution.

Three reports were published in the early 1960s helped to give momentum to the push for rapid transit. These reports viewed transit as a means to shaping and planning the future of the Atlanta region, as well as maintaining Atlanta's role as a regional center in the southeast. The third report, titled Rapid Atlanta was published in 1960 by the Atlanta Transit System which proposed a $59 million first phase of a  rapid transit system. This report received support in Atlanta's business community; in 1961 the president of the Atlanta Chamber of Commerce, Ivan Allen, named a rapid transit steering committee, which included Robert L. Sommerville, president of the Atlanta Transit System (Atlanta's public busing system), and was headed by Richard Rich, a former Chamber president. This committee worked with the ARMPC to send speakers to civic organizations and business groups to discuss rapid transit. Also in 1961 Atlanta mayor William Hartsfield appointed a rapid transit committee which worked with the ARMPC to lobby members of the Georgia General Assembly to look favorably on rapid transit. In 1962 the lobbying efforts proved successful; the Georgia legislature created the Metropolitan Atlanta Transit Study Commission (MATSC).

Formation of MARTA

A state constitutional amendment was required to establish a regional transportation agency. In November 1962 this amendment was approved by a majority of voters in DeKalb and Fulton counties but failed to pass statewide. The amendment did not specify the composition of the agency but stated in more general terms the nature of powers for the agency (taxing, eminent domain, expenditure of public funds) that would be designated by the state to a lower agency for the purposes of transit planning. As a result, many rural voters believed they were committing themselves to pay for a transit system in Atlanta. Opposition was also raised by the trucking industry in defense of highway funds.

In March 1963 the MATSC formed a committee which came to be known as the Rapid Transit Committee of 100 for the purpose of financing and publicizing the rapid transit campaign as outlined in the December 1962 report. In the same year the MATSC was dissolved by the state and replaced by a new organization called the Georgia State Study Commission. The Study Commission reviewed and approved the previous MATSC transit plan. The continued campaigning by regional and local groups led to the passing of a second transit-enabling state constitutional amendment in 1964. This second amendment however was not proposed statewide but was placed only on the ballots of five metropolitan Atlanta counties (Fulton, Cobb, Gwinnett, DeKalb, and Clayton). Approval was slim in Cobb county where the margin was only 403 votes.

The 1965 Metropolitan Atlanta Rapid Transit Authority Act was authored by State Senator Ben F. Johnson of DeKalb County.  In March of that year it was passed by the Georgia legislature setting up a rapid transit agency but required ratification by the five counties. In June 1965 voters in four of the five counties approved the creation of MARTA; only 43 percent of voters approved MARTA in Cobb County. MARTA was officially formed in January 1966.

1968 referendum
MARTA began work on developing a new 4 county rapid transit plan. In 1967 the agency published a new plan, titled Special Report - Rapid Transit for Metropolitan Atlanta, a  rapid transit rail system, at a cost of $190 million more than the previous  MATSC plan. Fears about the cost of the plan were published in a counter-proposal by Robert Somerville of the Atlanta Transit System, titled Rapid Busways, challenging the MARTA plan. Rapid Busways called for the creation of a  network of busways at a cost of $52 million as an interim plan to Atlanta's transit needs.

MARTA consultants worked to update the original MATSC plan into a smaller  rapid rail system, however this report was not published until September 1968. In November 1968 a Fulton County, DeKalb County, and city of Atlanta referendum allowing MARTA to move into capital programs failed to pass, receiving only 44.5 percent voter support. The failure of the funding referendum to pass has been attributed to many reasons:
The continuing controversy over the use of rail transport over busway transit
The decision of local transit unions to campaign against the referendum because it did not contain collective bargaining provisions
Conservatives claimed that the plan was financially irresponsible since Federal government financial support was not guaranteed
Low-income and suburban homeowners objected to the use of property tax to fund MARTA
Voters on the edge of the system objected because they felt that residents of the city of Atlanta would receive more benefits
Atlanta's black community complained it had not been involved in the planning and would not receive adequate service
Local officials in the region were not involved in planning
Publicity of the plan by MARTA was poor (despite a MARTA-sponsored fact-finding trip to Montreal and Toronto attended by many Atlanta business leaders to ride their existing subways)

1971 referendum
As a result of the 1968 referendum failure, MARTA began to address some of the controversial issues. MARTA enlisted the support of organized labor by amending the MARTA legislation to include collective bargaining provisions. Also MARTA began a campaign to draw in public officials and blacks into the planning of MARTA. MARTA also modified proposed service plans to include improved service to black neighborhoods, including its decision to use rail instead of bus service for the East-West and Proctor Creek Lines. Also the financial support of the system was changed from an unpopular property tax increase to a one-percent sales tax. Finally MARTA pledged to reduce bus fares to 15 cents for the first seven years.

Voters in DeKalb (52% support) and Fulton (51% support) counties approved the proposal, and voters in Clayton (23% support) and Gwinnett (21% support) defeated the proposal. The voters in Clayton and Gwinnett may have reacted negatively to the proposed plan which included only  of the rail system would have served both counties. Additionally the method of counting votes was changed for the 1971 referendum. In 1968 voters were grouped into three groups (all of which required a majority for passing): voters in the city limits of Atlanta, voters in Fulton county outside the city limits, and voters in DeKalb outside of the city limits. In 1971 the city votes were counted in the appropriate counties (DeKalb and Fulton), allowing the mostly yes votes from the city to be tabulated against the mostly no votes from the suburban areas in the county.

Initial construction
In 1971 MARTA purchased the Atlanta Transit System for $12.8 million.
In 1973 the state legislature established the Metropolitan Atlanta Rapid Transit Overview Committee.
In 1975 groundbreaking of the rail system took place. Also in 1975 the Urban Mass Transportation Administration offered $600 million to MARTA for a six-year period for rail transit construction.

East-West Line construction
Construction on the East Line began in 1975 and the first rail service began on June 30, 1979 between the Georgia State and Avondale stations. In June 1993, the Kensington and Indian Creek stations opened, which also marked the first time MARTA rail service went outside I-285.

The West Line opened between Hightower (now Hamilton E. Holmes) and Five Points stations, on December 22, 1979. On December 12, 1992 the Proctor Creek Branch and Bankhead Station opened. The 1979 plan for the West Line also included an additional station at Fairburn Road (later shortened to Brownlee-Boulder Park) and another station was planned at the then-existing Perry Homes housing project on the Proctor Creek Line.

North-South Line construction
On December 4, 1981, the North-South Line opened from Garnett to North Avenue, including Civic Center and the lower level of Five Points. On September 11, 1982, the line was expanded to Arts Center, and the Peachtree Center Station (whose opening was delayed from 1981) also opened. The section between Lindbergh Center and Brookhaven opened on December 15, 1984. The line reached Chamblee in 1987, and the Doraville terminus was finished in 1992. The section between Lenox and Doraville was redesignated the Northeast Line on June 8, 1996 when the North Line opened between Buckhead and Dunwoody stations, including a stretch in the Georgia 400 median. The last two North Line stations to open were Sandy Springs and North Springs, on December 16, 2000.

The Garnett station opened on December 4, 1981 and was the first South Line station to open. The section between the West End and Lakewood-Fort McPherson opened on December 15, 1984. The East Point Station opened on August 16, 1986. and the College Park and Airport Stations opened on June 18, 1988. The Airport Station however, was built in 1980 as part of the construction of Hartsfield International Airport and was unused until the line was connected in 1988.

Previous expansion plans
MARTA was built with at least three stubs for rail lines which were never built. The Northwest Line towards Cobb County has a stub tunnel east of Atlantic Station, but that redevelopment has not been built with a MARTA station in mind, and Cobb County would instead most likely get a light rail or commuter rail system (either of which have been studied) or a bus rapid transit service (see Northwest Corridor HOV/BRT). The Northwest line was cut back to a distance of two stations, and next the idea was dropped entirely.

The South Line's branch to Hapeville was considered for extension into Clayton County as far away as Forest Park, but this idea was also cut off when the voters of that county initially refused to approve tax funding for the line. Another idea for a rail spur line spur was for an above-ground line from near the International Airport for a spur line to the town of Hapeville, but no work has ever been executed. The idea to revive expansion plans in the form of heavy rail and bus was approved to go once again before voters in November 2014 by the Clayton county commissioners in July 2014 with a 1% sales tax providing the funding for said expansion. This time, the referendum was approved and Clayton County voted to join MARTA, the system's first ever expansion outside of Fulton, Dekalb and the city of Atlanta.

Yet another proposed spur line would have branched off the Blue Line in DeKalb County, running northeast to the area of North Druid Hills, Emory University, and the town of Tucker. Now under consideration is an idea for light rail line (rather than heavy rail) from Avondale Station to Lindbergh Center, via Emory/CDC.

The Northeast Line of the rail system, which has ended in Doraville for two decades, was considered for extension into Gwinnett County as far as northeast as Norcross, but this idea was cut off when the voters of that county declined to approve sales-tax funding for it.

The Proctor Creek branch was also projected to go one more station northwestward to the West Highlands neighborhood, but no work has been done on that one either.

Lack of funding
From 2000–Present, there have been no active railway expansion projects in the MARTA system due to lack of additional sales-tax funding, the need to spend its limited capital budget on refurbishing its older rolling stock, replacing the fare-collection system, repairing the tracks and their electrical systems, and other long-term maintenance, repair, and operations requirements.

Financial crisis
In early April 2009, the Georgia General Assembly created a budget crisis for MARTA by failing to pass a bill that would allow it to access its own capital reserve account, in order to compensate for a severe drop in sales-tax revenue during the late-2000s recession. MARTA stated that this could force the agency to discontinue operations one day out of the week, possibly a weekday. The agency's budget crisis forced MARTA to lay off 700 employees. Service cuts and other budget-stabilizing measures began in fiscal year 2011, with the first affected service mark-up in September 2010. Governor Sonny Perdue refused to call a special session as requested, and did not issue an executive order as he stated it would not be legal to do so.

Current expansion plans

Mall at Stonecrest expansion
Eastward expansion focuses on bus rapid transit from downtown Atlanta along I-20 and extension of heavy rail transit from Indian Creek station, south along I-285 to I-20, then east along the I-20 corridor to the Mall at Stonecrest. The current Green Line would also be extended east from its current terminus at Edgewood/Candler Park station to Mall at Stonecrest.

Memorial Drive BRT
Currently the only recent expansion in the entire MARTA system was the development of bus rapid transit along Memorial Drive from Kensington Station to the Goldsmith Road MARTA park and ride lot in Stone Mountain and Ponce De Leon Avenue. (Bus Service started operating on September 27, 2010). The bus had two routes: The Q Express runs between MARTA's Kensington Station and a free 150-car Park-and-Ride lot at Goldsmith Road & Memorial Drive; The Express only stops twice along the way at North Hairston Road and again at Georgia Perimeter College.

The Q Limited also ran north along Memorial Drive from Kensington Station but branched off at North Hairston Road on the way to East Ponce de Leon Avenue. The Q Limited had four stops along the way in addition the same stops for the Express. The implementation of revenue-collecting service had initially been planned for early 2009.

Due to low ridership, BRT service was discontinued.

Atlanta BeltLine

Additionally, several traffic corridors are currently being studied by MARTA for possible system expansion. The BeltLine is a current proposal for the use of light rail and possibly bus or streetcar service on existing railroad rights-of-way around Atlanta's central business districts. The conversion of existing rail right-of-way to the proposed BeltLine also calls for the creation of three additional MARTA rapid transit stations where existing lines intersect the Belt Line at Simpson Road, Hulsey Yard, and Murphy Crossing.

Clifton Corridor

Rapid transit alternatives are as of October 2011, under consideration for the Clifton Corridor, from Lindbergh Center, following the CSX rail corridor to Emory University and the Center for Disease Control, with possible continuation along the northern edge of Decatur on to Avondale MARTA station. Bus, light rail and heavy rail rapid-transit options had been considered, with light rail being selected as the preferred option.

Connect 400 
The Georgia 400 Transit Initiative (also known as "Connect 400") is a MARTA project to study options for expanding high-capacity transit along the Georgia State Route 400 corridor into the northern reaches of Fulton county.  The initiative, kicked off in December 2011, envisages an 11.9-mile extension of rapid transit service, starting in the south at North Springs Transit Station, the current terminus of the existing MARTA Red Line. From there, such an extension would continue northward through the cities of Sandy Springs, Roswell, and Alpharetta, terminating in the vicinity of Windward Parkway.

As of the fifth public meeting on the subject on September 26, 2013, the study had narrowed the field of transit technology alternatives to three, all using existing right-of-way along SR 400: heavy-rail transit (HRT, extending the Red Line northward), light-rail transit (LRT), or bus rapid transit (BRT). Early designs for all three options include stations near Northridge Road, Holcomb Bridge Road, Mansell Road, North Point Mall, and Windward Parkway; initial sketches of the LRT and BRT options also include a station near Old Milton Parkway.

As of June 2015, the project is moving into the Environmental Impact study stage of the planning process. According to MARTA Representatives at the April 2015 meetings, the expansion could open in 2025 at the earliest assuming a best-case scenario. Federal funding is still not approved; the Environmental Impact study must be complete. By the April 2015 meeting, the LRT option has been discarded. The HRT option has been approved as the Locally Preferred Alternative, though two BRT options exist - one that would run in a dedicated bus guideway and the other to integrate with Georgia DOT's planned work for the corridor. The GDOT integrated option would include sharing normal traffic lanes at least in some parts of the route. The plans for stations at Mansell Rd. and Haynes Bridge Rd. have been merged into one station at North Point Mall.

Proposed new infill stations
Adding another station to the existing line near Armour Yard (MARTA's main railyard, opened 2005) has also been discussed, as the Red and Gold MARTA lines, the northeast BeltLine light rail, proposed commuter rail lines to points northeast such as Athens (the "Brain Train") and Gainesville, would all pass through Armour Yard. Other stations that have been proposed are; Mechanicsville, Boone, Murphy Crossing, and Krog.

The proposed Atlanta Multimodal Passenger Terminal (MMPT) would be built next to Five Points station, connecting MARTA to surface passenger rail, including commuter rail, future intercity rail, Amtrak, and possible high-speed rail on the Southeast Corridor.

Additional expansion plans for MARTA and other metro Atlanta transportation agencies are detailed in Mobility 2030 a timeline by the Atlanta Regional Commission for improving transit through the year 2030.

Recent years

Clayton County

On July 5, 2014, the Clayton County Board of Commissioners, by a margin of 3-1 (Jeff Turner, Shana Rooks, and Sonna Gregory voting in favor,) approved a contract with MARTA to extend service to the county, financed by a 1 percent sales tax. Fulton and DeKalb county leaders approved the expansion. On November 4, 2014, Clayton County residents approved the 1% sales tax to join MARTA. Bus Service was implemented on March 21, 2015. The contract also includes provisions for future rail transit to the county by 2025.

One high-capacity/rail proposal calls for stations at Hapeville, Mountain View/ATL Hartsfield International Terminal, Forest Park, Fort Gillem, Clayton State/Morrow, Morrow/Southlake and Jonesboro by 2022. A station at Lovejoy is also proposed, which would open as a later phase. In 2018, commuter rail was selected as the locally preferred alternative of transit mode along the corridor.

Increased costs and lack of participation from the railroad led to the project's cancellation in 2021. MARTA chose to explore other transportation options to the county.

ATL Transit Law
In November 2016 Gwinnett and Fulton voters approved a half cent sales tax increase for expanding service. When the Interstate 85 Bridge collapsed MARTA  announced an extension of service in response to the incident. CEO Keith Parker reported ridership spiked by 25% the day following the collapse. In January 2018 the state legislature introduced House Bill 930 allowing 13 metro Atlanta counties to raise sales tax by 1 cent for transit expansion if voters approve, on May 3, 2018  Governor Nathan Deal signed the bill into law.

Gwinnett County 
In September 2018, MARTA's Board of Directors and the Gwinnett County Board of Commissioners gave conditional approval to an agreement which would see MARTA assume, and significantly expand, operations of Gwinnett's bus system (in operation since 2001) and clear the way for the long-sought-after extension of MARTA's rail system into the county from its current terminus at Doraville.

The contract with MARTA would go into effect only if a public vote, that was scheduled for March 19, 2019, succeeded. The agreement called for a new one-cent sales tax that would be collected in Gwinnett County until 2057.

On March 19, 2019, the third transit referendum failed, with 54.32% of the vote being "No" to expand.

Another referendum was held as part of the November 3rd, 2020 Presidential election, this only funding the extension of the rail system, not having MARTA assume operations of Gwinnett's bus system.  This referendum failed, with 50.13% of the vote opposed.

COVID-19 Pandemic 
During the COVID-19 pandemic MARTA suspended several bus routes in an effort to promote social distancing on the busier routes. As of April 24, 2021 all  suspended bus routes have been restored.

In April 2021 the Georgia state government finally announced funding towards MARTA. Announced as part of the state spending plan MARTA is set to receive $6 million towards the rehabilitation of Bankhead station which will serve the site of the planned Microsoft campus.

On January 14, 2022, MARTA CEO Jeffrey Parker committed suicide by stepping in front of a moving train at the East Lake station.

Fare history
Below is the history of single one-way fares on MARTA:  
1972:  MARTA purchases the Atlanta Transit Company and reduces bus fare from US$0.40 to US$0.15.
1979:  MARTA raises the fare to US$0.25
1980:  MARTA raises the fare to US$0.50
1981:  MARTA raises the fare to US$0.60
1987:  MARTA raises the fare to US$0.75
1989:  MARTA raises the fare to US$0.85
1990:  MARTA raises the fare to US$1.00
1992:  MARTA raises the fare to US$1.25
1996:  MARTA raises the fare to US$1.50
2000:  MARTA raises the fare to US$1.75
2006:  MARTA completes transition from token and cash fare collection to Breeze Card smart-card system; fare remains US$1.75
2009:  Fare is raised to $2.00 when the state legislature fails to allow MARTA to spend its own capital money on operations.
2011:  Fare is raised to $2.50

Special events

MARTA has played an important role in Atlanta's hosting of major events, including:
1994 Super Bowl XXVIII
1996 Summer Olympics
2000 Super Bowl XXXIV
2018 College Football Playoff National Championship
2019 Super Bowl LIII
For some of these important events special tokens were issued.

See also
Timeline of mass transit in Atlanta

References

External links
Assessment of Community Planning for Mass Transit:  Volume 2--Atlanta Case Study.  United States Congress, Office of Technology Assessment.  February 1976.
History of MARTA

Metropolitan Atlanta Rapid Transit Authority
History of transportation in the United States
History of Atlanta
Transportation in Atlanta
Metropolitan Atlanta Rapid Transit Authority